Fatima Memorial System is a health care complex and educational organization based in Lahore, Punjab, Pakistan. It was founded by Begum Saida Waheed.

History
Fatima Memorial Hospital, established in 1977, is a not-for-profit teaching hospital located in Shadman, Lahore, that has a total of 510 beds and specializes in the field of maternal and child healthcare center.
FMH College of Medicine and Dentistry, established in 2001, is a private college of medicine and dentistry which is located in Shadman, Lahore. The college is accredited by the Pakistan Medical and Dental Council and affiliated with the University of Health Sciences, Lahore. The Fatima Memorial Hospital is attached as a teaching hospital.
Saida Waheed College of Nursing, established in 1998 and named after Begum Saida Waheed, is a private college of nursing which is located on Raiwind Road, Lahore. The college is accredited by the Pakistan Nursing Council and affiliated with the University of Health Sciences, Lahore.
FMH Institute of Allied Health Sciences
FMH Centre for Postgraduate Training
FMS Centre for Health Research

Hospital Services

Clinical Services 
Internal Medicine
Gastroenterology
Pulmonology
Nephrology including Dialysis Unit
Rheumatology
Endocrinology
Neurology
Cardiology
Dermatology
Psychiatry
Oncology
Physiotherapy
Clinical Nutrition and Dietary Services
Speech and Language Pathology
Audiology
Department of Emergency

Special Facility 
General Surgery
Orthopedics and Skeletal Trauma
ENT
Ophthalmology
Urology
Bariatric Surgery

Maternal and Child Health 
Obstetrics and Gynaecology
Maternal Fetal Medicine Unit
Pediatrics
Neonatology

Dentistry 
Oral and Maxillofacial Surgery

References

External links

Medical and health organisations based in Pakistan